Bought & Sold could mean:

 Bought & Sold (television program)
 Bought & Sold (book), 2016 book by Megan Stephens
 Bought & Sold: Scotland, Jamaica and Slavery, 2022 book by Kate Phillips